Gustav Huber was an Austrian international footballer. At club level, he played for Wiener AC. He made 3 appearances for the Austria national team, scoring two goals.

External links
 
 National team stats

Association football midfielders
Austrian footballers
Austria international footballers
Wiener AC players
Year of birth missing